Harare North is a constituency of the National Assembly of the Parliament of Zimbabwe, located in the northern suburbs of Harare. An older constituency, Salisbury North, existed in the Parliament of Rhodesia between 1924 and 1979. The current MP for Harare North since 2018 is Rusty Markham of the Movement for Democratic Change Alliance.

Members

Election results

Notes and references

Notes

References 

 Zimbabwe Electoral Commission, Elections to the House of Assembly

Harare
Parliamentary constituencies in Zimbabwe